Naval Service may refer to either:
 His Majesty's Naval Service, Britain's Royal Navy plus additional services
 Naval Service (Ireland), a branch of the Irish Defence Forces
 United States Department of the Navy, United States military department encompassing the United States Navy and United States Marine Corps
 Vietnam People's Navy (alternatively Naval Service), the naval force of the former North Vietnam and now the Socialist Republic of Vietnam.